Amberleyoidea is a superfamily of extinct, small to large sea snails, marine gastropod mollusks in the clade Vetigastropoda.

References 

Vetigastropoda